Donald Moffitt (1931–2014) was a science fiction writer.

Donald Moffitt is also the name of:
Donald L. Moffitt (born 1947), Illinois state representative

See also
Don Moffett, American actor
Donald Moffat (1930–2018), English-born American actor